IEEEXtreme (often abbreviated as Xtreme) is an annual hackathon and competitive programming challenge in which teams of IEEE Student members, often supported by an IEEE Student Branch and proctored by an IEEE member, compete in a 24-hour time span against each other to solve a set of programming problems.  The competition is underwritten and coordinated by IEEE's Membership and Geographic Activities department, and is often supported by partnering sponsors, like IEEE Computer Society.

History
IEEEXtreme was created in 2006 by Marko Delimar and Ricardo Varela who, at the time, were with the IEEE Student Activities Committee. The first instance of IEEEXtreme was held in 2006 with a global participation of 44 teams and 150 contestants.  The numbers more than tripled the second time it was held, in 2008, to 130 teams with 500 participants. The iteration of IEEEXtreme in 2015, enjoyed the registration of over 2,300 teams,  participation of over 1,900 teams, 5,500+ student competitors, 600+ proctors, and 100+ volunteers around the world.

Competition rules
Teams of up to three student IEEE members receive sets of programming problems over 24 hours, starting at 0:00 UTC on the competition date. All teams receive the same problems to solve and are expected to solve the problems without direct outside consultation. Teams don’t need to tackle every problem, but the more they solve, the more points they score. Students submit their solutions using an online tool, which has been HackerRank in recent years. Points are awarded based on how the problem was solved, the time it took, and its difficulty. Higher-grade IEEE members serve as judges and proctors for the competition.

The competition is free, but IEEE Student Membership is required to participate. Students - undergraduate and graduate - are welcome to register as IEEE Student Members and participants in IEEEXtreme on the same day. The cost of IEEE Student Membership varies from country to country.

Yearly results

IEEEXtreme 12.0 (2018)
IEEEXtreme 12.0 was held on 19 October 2018.

IEEEXtreme 11.0 (2017)
IEEEXtreme 11.0 was held on 14 October 2017.

IEEEXtreme 10.0 (2016)
IEEEXtreme 10.0 was held on 22 October 2016.

IEEEXtreme 9.0 (2015)

IEEEXtreme 9.0 was held on 27 October 2015.

IEEEXtreme 8.0 (2014)

IEEEXtreme 8.0 was held on 18 October 2014.

IEEEXtreme 7.0 (2013)
IEEEXtreme 7.0 was held on 26 October 2013.

IEEEXtreme 3.0 (2009)
IEEEXtreme 3.0 was held on 24 October 2009.

See also 
 Competitive programming, a type of mind sport involved in programming competitions

References 

Programming contests
Recurring events established in 2006